Rufus Lewis (December 13, 1919 – December 17, 1999) was an American professional baseball pitcher who played in Negro league baseball, as well as in Cuban, Mexican and Venezuelan professional leagues affiliated to organized baseball.

Lewis pitched in three games for the Eagles in the 1946 Negro World Series, pitching in relief in Game 1 for teammate Hilton Smith before getting starts in Game 4 and Game 7; Lewis went 2-1, including wins in both starts as Newark won their only championship; Lewis pitched a complete game while allowing eight hits with two runs while walking four and striking out eight batters.

A native of Hattiesburg, Mississippi, Lewis served in the United States Army Air Forces during World War II. He died in Southfield, Michigan in 1999 at age 80.

Sources

External links
 and Seamheads

1919 births
1999 deaths
African-American baseball players
American expatriate baseball players in Mexico
United States Army Air Forces personnel of World War II
Azules de Veracruz players
Baseball players from Mississippi
Diablos Rojos del México players
Dorados de Chihuahua players
Habana players
Mexican League baseball pitchers
Navegantes del Magallanes players
American expatriate baseball players in Venezuela
Newark Eagles players
Pittsburgh Crawfords players
Sportspeople from Hattiesburg, Mississippi